Maharaja Ram Singh Kaiser-i-Hind (1873 – 1929) was the ruling Maharaja of princely state Bharatpur (1893–1900) and successor of Maharaja Jaswant Singh. 
His ruling powers were suspended on 10 August 1900 after the murder of one of his personal servants after which he was exiled to Agra.
He was succeeded by his wife Maharani Girraj Kaur who was regent for her son Kishan Singh from 27 August 1900 to 28 November 1918 until he came of age.

Early life
He was born at Lohagarh, Bharatpur on 21 September 1873, as second son of Maharaja Jashwant Singh by his second wife, Maharani Darya Kaur. He succeeded on the death of his father on 12 December 1893. He ascended the gadi on 25 December 1893.

References

External links
Jashwant Singh at Durbar
Genealogy of the ruling chiefs of Bharatpur
Laxmi Vilas Palace Bharatpur History

Rulers of Bharatpur state
1873 births
1929 deaths
Recipients of the Kaisar-i-Hind Medal
Jat rulers
Jat